Harrison Ludington (July 30, 1812June 17, 1891) was an American businessman, Republican politician, and Wisconsin pioneer. He served as the 13th governor of Wisconsin and was the 20th and 22nd mayor of Milwaukee, Wisconsin.

Early life and career
Ludington was born in Ludingtonville, Putnam County, New York, in July 1812.  He was educated in the district schools in New York, then came west to the Wisconsin Territory with his uncle, Lewis Ludington, in 1838.

He became a partner with his uncle and Harvey Birchard in a merchandise business known as Ludington & Company, which operated out of a warehouse previously owned by Solomon Juneau.  He continued with this business until 1851, when he became involved in a lumber business in partnership with Daniel Wells, Jr., and Anthony Van Schaick, known as Ludington, Wells, and Van Schaick.  Over the next 40 years, their lumber business grew to become one of the largest lumber producers in the northwest states.

With his profits, Ludington accumulated a large amount of real estate in Milwaukee, which he developed and leased out.  He also established a large farm in the town of Wauwatosa, Wisconsin, and became a leading promoter of the Wisconsin Agricultural Society.

Political career 
Politically, Ludington was originally a Whig, but joined the Republican Party when it was organized in 1856.  He was elected to the Milwaukee City Council in 1861 and 1862, and was elected mayor three times, in 1871, 1873, and 1874.  The 1873 election, however, was quite irregular.  In the spring general election, Ludington was defeated by his Democratic opponent, Levi Kellogg.  However Kellogg was ruled ineligible because he was already holding another office. Kellogg resigned his other office, and a special election was called less than a month after the original election. In that special election, Ludington prevailed over Kellogg.

During his third term as Mayor, he was chosen as the Republican nominee for Governor of Wisconsin, challenging incumbent Democrat William Robert Taylor.  In the 1875 general election, Ludington prevailed with a margin of just 601 votes.

In his capacity as governor, Harrison Ludington facilitated promotion of commercial activity. He also undid changes in the financial sector made by his predecessor. He stood against state regulation of railroads. Under his administration the infamous Potter law was repealed, which was supposed to drastically increase government intervention in the railroad business. He also replaced the railroad commission, made up of three members with powers of establishing rates for the railroads, by a single commissioner who lacked such authority. Ludington declined renomination for the position of governor in 1879 due to pressure from younger members of the Republican party.

Retirement 
Following his decision not to pursue renomination for governorship, Ludington resigned from public affairs and devoted himself to conducting business. German-American artist Conrad W. Heyd painted his portrait in this period of his life.

Ludington died at his home in Milwaukee on June 17, 1891, after suffering a stroke a week earlier.  He was interred in Milwaukee's historic Forest Home Cemetery.

Personal life and family 
Harrison Ludington was the eldest of fifteen children born to Frederick Ludington and his wife Susannah ( Griffeth).  Harrison's paternal grandfather was Colonel Henry Ludington, who commanded the 7th Regiment of Dutchess County Militia during the American Revolutionary War.  He also served as an aide to General George Washington during the Battle of White Plains and served several years in the New York Legislature.  Henry's daughter, Sybil Ludington (1761–1839), was famous for risking her life when she was 16 years old to warn the American militia that British troops were burning Danbury, Connecticut; these accounts, originating from the Ludington family, are questioned by modern scholars.

The Ludingtons are descendants of William Luddington, an early American colonist from England, who settled at Charlestown, Massachusetts Bay Colony, in 1632, and died at the East Haven Iron Works, Connecticut Colony, in October 1661.

Harrison Ludington married twice.  He first married Frances White, on March 25, 1838, in Louisville, Kentucky.  With Frances, he had two sons and four daughters before her death in 1873.  On June 7, 1875, he married Emeline Tobey ( Macy), the widow of Rhodolphus H. Tobey, who survived him.

Electoral history

Milwaukee Mayor (1871, 1873, 1874)

| colspan="6" style="text-align:center;background-color: #e9e9e9;"| General Election, April 4, 1871

| colspan="6" style="text-align:center;background-color: #e9e9e9;"| Special Election, April 23, 1873

Wisconsin Governor (1875)

| colspan="6" style="text-align:center;background-color: #e9e9e9;"| General Election, November 2, 1875

See also 

 Nelson Ludington
 Henry Ludington
 James Ludington
 Lewis Ludington
 Ludington family

References

Sources

External links

1812 births
1891 deaths
Republican Party governors of Wisconsin
Mayors of Milwaukee
Milwaukee Common Council members
People from Dutchess County, New York
People from Kent, New York
19th-century American politicians
Ludington family
19th-century American businesspeople